Mexico is one of the most dangerous countries in the world for journalists and among the ones with the highest levels of unsolved crimes against the press. Though the exact figures of those killed are often conflicting, press freedom organizations around the world agree through general consensus that Mexico is among the most dangerous countries on the planet to exercise journalism as a profession. More than 100 media workers have been killed or disappeared since 2000, and most of these crimes remained unsolved, improperly investigated, and with few perpetrators arrested and convicted.

Historical summary 

Targeted killings of journalists in Mexico have existed since the reign of Porfirio Díaz and the Mexican Revolution in 1910. When the Institutional Revolutionary Party (PRI) ruled the presidency in the 1930s following the Revolution, the Mexican government practically monopolized the press in Mexico in order to get favorable coverage in the media. Journalists who complied with the modus operandi were paid with government handouts and gifts; those who did not were intimidated and/or killed. Throughout the 1970s and the 1980s, Mexico was the most dangerous country for journalists in all of Latin America. However, most of the attacks against the press were carried out by upset drug traffickers and corrupt law enforcement officials because they were the ones mentioned in the press.

Through the government's use of informal coercion and media blackout, the Mexican press became accustomed to limit their reports to what state officials said. Very few journalists dared to break away from this practice because the government would thereby threaten to withdraw their advertisements and prevent the state-owned paper agency of that time to sell newsprints for their publications.

When the Mexican government began to sell off the media public enterprises in the 1980s, more autonomous and independent newspapers with diversity in their news coverages were born. During this decade, the PRI began to lose several local and state elections, and eventually lost the presidency in 2000 to the National Action Party (PAN), after they had won every presidential election since 1929. With this political transition, Mexican readers began to prefer media outlets that showed a level of integrity and autonomy.

When former President Felipe Calderón of the PAN took office in 2006, he carried out a military-led campaign to tackle Mexico's drug trafficking organizations. Violence across Mexico spread shortly thereafter, as rival organized crime groups fought for territorial control and with the government. This rise in drug-related murders came alongside a spike of attacks against the press, with drug cartels and corrupt officials wanting to take control the flow of information that reached the news. Organized crime groups traditionally attack traditional print newspapers, either by killing, disappearing, or intimidating their reporters.

With traditional media being too intimidating to reporters, some newspapers in Mexico have self-censored and stopped writing about drug trafficking and organized crime. Others simply limit their coverage to the information found in official government press releases or police reports, while others, however, are forced to write what a drug trafficking organization orders them to publish. Journalists have to be careful when they decide to write about the drug violence in Mexico because little things can incur a reprisal; using simple words like "organized crime" are often just what they need to anger a drug trafficking organization.

Criminal organizations target journalists for various reasons. Among the most common one is to silence the press in the areas they operate in, and especially when the groups are trying to establish their presence in an area. They also kill journalists as retributions for publications that may damage their business. Cartels want the press to be silent because keeping an image that a city is safe can prevent the Mexican government from sending more federal troops to the area. In addition, Mexican media outlets find themselves vulnerable to attacks when they are in an area with two or more organized crime groups. A group might threaten to kill a journalist if there is coverage of them on the media, while another group might do the same if there is not any coverage.

Attacks against the press have continued under the administration of President Enrique Peña Nieto. Violence has compromised the news that reaches the rest of the world. Local journalists are largely responsible for reporting what happens day-to-day in Mexico and the international media relies on them.

Violence against journalists and media workers in Mexico has increased by 85% since Andrés Manuel López Obrador took power. López Obrador, who frequently attacks journalists and independent news outlets during his morning briefings, has often downplayed the threats against the press.

There was a surge of killings in early 2022.

Before the Mexican drug war

Reform War, Second Empire and Restored Republic

Porfiriato and Revolution

Constitution of 1917 to Presidency of Lázaro Cardenas

Presidencies of Manuel Ávila Camacho to Luis Echeverría, 1940–1976

Presidencies of José López Portillo to Ernesto Zedillo, 1976–2000

Presidency of Vicente Fox, 2000–2006

During the Mexican drug war

Presidency of Felipe Calderón

Presidency of Enrique Peña Nieto

Presidency of Andrés Manuel López Obrador

See also 

 Political murder
 Index of Mexico-related articles
 List of journalists killed in Guatemala
 List of journalists killed in Honduras
 List of journalists killed in Venezuela
 List of politicians killed in the Mexican drug war
 Human rights in Mexico

Sources

Footnotes

References

Bibliography

External links
Journalists in southern Mexico 'live in terror' of gangs' violence (AFP August 2020)

Mexico
 
Journalists
 
Mexico
Journalists killed
Journalists